Burr Oak Creek is a stream in Jackson County in the U.S. state of Missouri. It is a tributary of Little Blue River.

Burr Oak Creek was named for the burr oak timber along its course.

See also
List of rivers of Missouri

References

Rivers of Jackson County, Missouri
Rivers of Missouri